Ludvig Immanuel Nobel (27 July 1831 – 12 April 1888) was a Swedish-Russian engineer, a noted businessman and a humanitarian. One of the most prominent members of the Nobel family, he was the son of Immanuel Nobel (also an engineering pioneer) and Andriette Nobel, and the older brother of Alfred Nobel (founder of the Nobel Prize).  With his brother Robert, he operated Branobel, an oil company in Baku, Azerbaijan which at one point produced 50% of the world's oil. He is credited with creating the Russian oil industry. Ludvig Nobel built the largest fortune of any of the Nobel brothers and was one of the world's richest men. Following the Bolshevik revolution, the communists confiscated the Nobel family's vast fortune in Russia.

Early history
Nobel was born in Stockholm. At 28 years old, he was given by his father's creditors the technical management of the family business, Fonderies et Ateliers Mécaniques Nobel Fils, a factory making war supplies such as mines and steam engines. The company had been facing financial difficulties since the end of the Crimean War in 1856 due to a severe cut in the military budget ordered by the new Tsar Alexander II, and eventually, in 1862, Immanuel's firm was sold by his creditors.

With some funds he had managed to save, Ludvig opened a new firm, the Machine-Building Factory Ludvig Nobel. Initially producing chilled cast-iron shells, the factory became in a few years one of the largest producers of gun carriages of Russia.

Early success in Russia
While running the factory in St. Petersburg, Ludvig obtained a large contract to manufacture rifles for the Russian government and he needed wood for the rifle stocks.  He sent his oldest brother, Robert Nobel in 1873 to procure Russian walnut wood in the Caucasus region of southern Russia.  Without consulting his brother, Robert spent the 25,000 rubbles that Ludvig entrusted to him for buying wood – "walnut money" –  and instead bought a small refinery in Baku.  Ludvig sent additional funds to Robert to invest in modernisation and refinery efficiency. By 1876, the Nobel brothers established themselves as the most competent refiner in Baku and sent the first shipment of illuminating oil to St. Petersburg.  By 1879, Ludvig turned the initial business into a shareholding company, Branobel, of which he was the major shareholder and had as partners his brothers Robert and Alfred Nobel.

Inventions
Ludvig Nobel invented oil tankers, and better refineries, pipelines. Before 1880 the United States was Russia's teacher in most aspects of the oil business. The roles were reversed in some respects by Nobel. The oil business lacked technical know-how and scientific methodology. To rectify this, Nobel established technical chemical research labs in Baku. These research centers were very active and when something of commercial interest was found, Nobel was fast in trying the new products out on a large scale. Dozens of scientists were employed, finding ways to treat oil, developing new uses for oil, and developing products derived from oil. 

Nobel first experimented with carrying oil in bulk on single-hulled barges. Turning his attention to self-propelled tankships, a primary concern was to keep the cargo and fumes well away from the engine room to avoid fires. Other challenges included allowing for the cargo to expand and contract due to temperature changes, and providing a method to ventilate the tanks.
The world's first successful oil tanker was Nobel's Zoroaster. He designed this in Lindholmen-Motala in Sweden with Sven Almqvist.  The contract to build it was signed January 1878, and it made its first run later that year from Baku to Astrakhan. The design was widely studied and copied, with Nobel refusing to patent any part of it. In October 1878, he ordered two more tankers of the same design: the Buddha and the Nordenskjöld. The first tank steamer of the United States was built after drawings and calculations of Nobel after his 1888 death in Cannes.

Humanitarian efforts
Nobel was a strong humanitarian as well as a businessman, full of ideas and visions. He introduced profit sharing and worked actively to improve working conditions in his factories. His humanity and social approach was unique for the time.  In 1885 he started a cooperative bank, sparkasse, for the workers. In Baku, social areas were built for the workers like dining rooms, billiard rooms, libraries and conference rooms where speeches and discussions were held. Near his estate, Villa Petrolea, several houses for the workers were built and a shuttle boat was offered between the city and the harbour. The company donated funds to schools and ran a hospital. Ludvig and Robert created a large park, still existent, in the "Black City" section of Baku near Villa Petrolea.

See also
 Branobel
 Immanuel Nobel
 Marta Nobel-Oleinikoff
 Nobelite

References

Further reading
 
 Schück, Henrik, Ragnar Sohlman, Anders Österling, Carl Gustaf Bernhard, the Nobel Foundation, and Wilhelm Odelberg, eds. Nobel: The Man and His Prizes. 1950. 3rd ed. Coordinating Ed., Wilhelm Odelberg. New York: American Elsevier Publishing Company, Inc., 1972, p. 14.  (10).  (13). (Originally published in Swedish as Nobelprisen 50 år: forskare, diktare, fredskämpar.)
 Yergin, Daniel (2003): The Prize: the Epic Quest for Oil, Money and Power, Free Press, p. 58. 
 Åsbrink, Brita (2001): Ludvig Nobel: "Petroleum har en lysande framtid!" Wahlström & Widstrand, p. 19. 
 Documents of Life and Activity of The Nobel Family. Under the editorship of Professor Arkady Melua. Series of books. St Petersburg, Humanistica, 2009-...

External links
 
 A biography on the Nobel Prize web site
 The Tsaritsyn Heritage of the Nobel Brothers 

19th-century Swedish engineers
19th-century Swedish inventors
1831 births
1888 deaths
Businesspeople from the Russian Empire
Ludvig
19th-century Swedish businesspeople
Inventors from the Russian Empire
Burials at Smolensky Lutheran Cemetery